The 2025 Africa Cup of Nations, known for short as the 2025 AFCON or CAN 2025, is scheduled to be the 35th edition of the biennial African international association football tournament organized by CAF.

The edition of the tournament will be the 2nd to take place in the northern summer since the 2019 edition to reduce scheduling conflicts with European club teams and competitions.

Guinea was the set to be the original host of the tournament but CAF stripped it of hosting rights after affirming its inadequacy of hosting preparations.

Host selection

Host shift
CAF stripped Cameroon from hosting the 2019 edition on 30 November 2018 due the lack of speed of progress in preparations, but however accepted former CAF President Ahmad Ahmad's request to stage the next edition in 2021. Consequently, the original hosts of 2021, Ivory Coast, became hosts of the 2023 edition with Guinea instead hosting the 2025 edition. CAF President confirmed the timetable shift after a meeting with Ivorian President Alassane Ouattara in Abidjan, Ivory Coast on 30 January 2019.

Fresh host bidding
On 30 September 2022, CAF president Dr. Patrice Motsepe announced that Guinea was stripped of hosting the 2025 edition due to inadequacy and speed of progress in hosting preparations. Consequently, a new process was re-opened for a replacement host bidder.

Bids: 
 Algeria
 Morocco
 Nigeria and  Benin
 Zambia

Bidding Process Timelines:
11 November 2022: Deadline for submitting the Declaration of Interest form
16 November 2022: Deadline for CAF to send the hosting documents to Member Associations that have declared their interest.
16 December 2022: Deadline for Member Associations to submit their final bid, including all bidding and hosting documents (hosting agreement, host cities agreement, Government guarantees)
20 March–2 April 2023: Inspection visits
mid April: Appointment of Host Country/Countries by the CAF Executive Committee

Qualification

Qualified teams
The following teams have qualified for the tournament.

Venues
CAF has established the following requirements for the expected 6 stadiums for this edition of the tournament:

References

Africa Cup of Nations tournaments
2025 in African football
Scheduled association football competitions